Nollamara is a suburb of Perth, Western Australia. Its local government area is the City of Stirling.

The name "Nollamara" is a Noongar word for the flowering plant Macropidia, commonly known as the black kangaroo paw.

Previously known as a lower income area, Nollamara has gone through a period of gentrification over the past decade that continues on to this day. Older homes are being replaced with new townhomes and there has been a surge in young families and professionals populating the suburb. The area is characterized by extensive trees, parks and recreational facilities. The newly renovated Des Penman Reserve is a good example of this as it includes tennis, soccer, lawn-bowls, playground, shaded lunch areas and BBQ facilities. Parts of Nollamara are elevated, providing views of surrounding neighborhoods.

Nollamara borders prominent areas such as Yokine and Dianella that are host to multimillion-dollar homes. A newly developed Flinders Street and Wanneroo Road provide easy access to Leederville, Subiaco, Northbridge and the Perth CBD.

Transport
The suburb is served by a number of Transperth bus routes operated by Swan Transit and Path Transit. The 354 (Mirrabooka-Yokine) covers Nollamara Shopping Centre and Flinders Street. The 384 (Mirrabooka-Perth) covers the Nollamara Shopping Centre and Wanneroo Road. The 370 and 970 (Mirrabooka-Perth) covers Flinders Street and inner portions of the suburb, the 389 (Wanneroo-Perth) and the 385/386 (Marangaroo-Perth) covers Wanneroo Road south to Perth, the 371 (Warwick-Mirrabooka) and 415 (Stirling-Mirrabooka) covers Ravenswood Drive in the north.

Facilities
Quan The Am Nunnery, a Vietnamese Buddhist temple is located in the suburb.

References

Suburbs of Perth, Western Australia
Suburbs in the City of Stirling